Tiago César Moreira Pereira (born 4 July 1975), known simply as Tiago, is a Portuguese former professional footballer who played as a defensive midfielder.

He amassed Primeira Liga totals of 282 matches and six goals over 12 seasons, mainly in representation of União de Leiria (five years) and Boavista (three). He started and ended his extensive career with Trofense.

Club career
Born in Trofa, Porto District, tough-tackling Tiago started his professional career with F.C. Famalicão in 1993, and went on to represent in his country C.S. Marítimo, S.L. Benfica, U.D. Leiria, FC Porto (winning the 2002–03 UEFA Cup with the club and finishing the following campaign on loan with Leiria) and Boavista FC.

In July 2007, the 32-year-old returned to União Leiria. Two years later, after being instrumental in its return to the Primeira Liga after one year out, only missing one game, he moved to another team in the Segunda Liga, C.D. Trofense, which had just moved in the opposite direction. He remained in the second tier of Portuguese football with the latter side for several seasons, playing into his 40s.

Tiago also had abroad stints with Rayo Vallecano (1998–99) and CD Tenerife (1999–2000, both in the Spanish Segunda División), helping the Madrid club promote to La Liga.

Honours
Porto
Primeira Liga: 2002–03, 2003–04
Taça de Portugal: 2002–03
UEFA Cup: 2002–03

União Leiria
UEFA Intertoto Cup: 2007

References

External links

1975 births
Living people
Sportspeople from Trofa
Portuguese footballers
Association football midfielders
Primeira Liga players
Liga Portugal 2 players
Segunda Divisão players
C.D. Trofense players
F.C. Famalicão players
C.S. Marítimo players
S.L. Benfica footballers
U.D. Leiria players
FC Porto players
Boavista F.C. players
Segunda División players
CD Tenerife players
Rayo Vallecano players
UEFA Cup winning players
Portugal under-21 international footballers
Portuguese expatriate footballers
Expatriate footballers in Spain
Portuguese expatriate sportspeople in Spain